The Spirulinaceae is a family of cyanobacteria, the only family in the order Spirulinales. Its members are notable for having coiled trichomes.

References

Cyanobacteria families